Red Snapper is a common type of fish.

It may also refer to:
 Red Snapper (band), an electronic music band from the United Kingdom.
 Ethan Albright, NFL long snapper for the Washington Redskins, known as "The Red Snapper" for his bright red hair
 Red Snapper (cocktail), a variant of a Bloody Mary with gin instead of vodka
 Alternate name to the DiGiCo SD9 digital audio console
 A type of sausage popular in Maine